Algo más que morir is a 2014 Spanish Western film directed by Oier Martínez de Santos and José Luis Murga. It was released on October 11, 2014 at the 4º Almeria Western Film Festival, where it received the Premio al Público and Especial Almeria Collection. It was shot in Kuartango. It is portrayed by José Luis Murga in the role of Dick Murray.

It was shown on May 13, 2015 at the Facultad de Letras de Vitoria of the Universidad del País Vasco.

Cast 
 Laida Burguera as Lizzi Murray, Dick and Lilly's daughter.
 Kepa Jiménez as Carson, a cacique who kills and kidnaps ranchers.
 Maite Marcos as Lilly Murray, Dick's spouse.
 José Luis Murga as Dick Murray, who has been looking for his brother during seven years.
 Javier Salazar as Pat, a dishonest player and drinker.

References

External links 
 

2014 films
2014 Western (genre) films
Films shot in Spain
Spanish Western (genre) films
2010s Spanish-language films
2010s Spanish films